Kjell Eliassen (born 18 August 1929) is a Norwegian diplomat.

He was born in Vefsn, and holds the cand.jur. degree. He was hired in the Norwegian Ministry of Foreign Affairs in 1953, and among others he worked as secretary (from 1958 to 1960) and councillor (from 1967 to 1970) at the Embassy of Norway in Moscow. Between 1970 and 1977 he worked in the Ministry of Foreign Affairs again, arbitrating with the Soviet Union, especially about the Barents Sea and Svalbard. He later served as the Norwegian ambassador to the Socialist Federal Republic of Yugoslavia from 1977 to 1980, permanent under-secretary of state in the Ministry of Foreign Affairs from 1980 to 1984, then as ambassador to the United States from 1984 to 1988, the United Kingdom from 1989 to 1994 and Germany from 1994 to 1998.

He was decorated as a Commander with Star of the Royal Norwegian Order of St. Olav in 1981.

References

1929 births
Living people
People from Vefsn
Norwegian civil servants
Norwegian expatriates in the Soviet Union
Ambassadors of Norway to Yugoslavia
Ambassadors of Norway to the United States
Ambassadors of Norway to the United Kingdom
Ambassadors of Norway to Germany